Rak Nakara is a Thai language novel written by Piyaphon Sakkasem, and has been adapted as a Thai television drama multiple times, most recently in 2017. The storyline takes place in Northern Thailand during the reign of Chulalongkorn, and follows the romances of the Lan Na royals.

Adaptations
Rak Nakara was most recently adapted as a television series in 2017. Filming took place in the Northern Thai town of Lampang. The series was initially set to air three nights a week. However, the death of Bhumibol Adulyadej forced an acceleration to the series' release schedule, and the series aired every night through its finale on October 3.

Cast

Original soundtracks

2000

2017

Ratings 
 — the number of the highest rating
 — the number of the lowest rating

References 

2000s Thai television series 
2000 Thai television series debuts
2000 Thai television series endings
2010s Thai television series 
2017 Thai television series debuts
2017 Thai television series endings
Thai novels
Thai historical television series
1998 works
Historical novels
Thai television soap operas
Channel 3 (Thailand) original programming
Channel 7 (Thailand) original programming